Marquess of Sligo is a title in the Peerage of Ireland. It was created in 1800 for John Browne, 3rd Earl of Altamont. The Marquess holds the subsidiary titles of Baron Mount Eagle, of Westport in the County of Mayo (created 10 September 1760),  Viscount Westport, of Westport in the County of Mayo (created 24 August 1768), Earl of Altamont, in the County of Mayo (created 4 December 1771), Earl of Clanricarde (created 1800) and Baron Monteagle, of Westport in the County of Mayo (created 20 February 1806). All these titles are in the Peerage of Ireland, except the Barony of Monteagle, which is in the Peerage of the United Kingdom. The latter peerage entitled the Marquesses to a seat in the House of Lords prior to the House of Lords Act 1999. The Earldom of Clanricarde was inherited by the sixth Marquess in 1916 according to a special remainder in the letters patent.

History
The Browne family descends from Colonel John Browne, younger son of Sir John Browne, 1st Baronet, of The Neale, County Mayo, whose eldest son, the second Baronet, was the ancestor of the Barons Kilmaine. The baronetcy was created in 1636. Colonel John Browne's grandson John Browne represented Castlebar in the Irish House of Commons. He was created Baron Mount Eagle in 1760, Viscount Westport in 1768 and Earl of Altamont in 1771, the titles of Mount Eagle and Altamont deriving from Croagh Patrick near Westport. Both his son, the second Earl, and grandson, the third Earl, represented County Mayo in the Irish Parliament. In 1800 the latter was elected as one of the 28 original Irish Representative Peers and later that year he was created Marquess of Sligo.

In 1806, he was made Baron Monteagle in the Peerage of the United Kingdom, which gave the Marquesses an automatic seat in the House of Lords. He was succeeded by his son, the second Marquess. He was Lord Lieutenant of County Mayo from 1842 to 1845. Lord Sligo married Lady Hester Catherine de Burgh, eldest daughter of John Thomas de Burgh, 13th Earl of Clanricarde.

In 1800, Lord Clanricarde was given a new Earldom of Clanricarde, with remainder, failing heirs male of his own, to the heirs male of his two daughters. Lord Sligo's younger son, the fourth Marquess, represented County Mayo in Parliament from 1857 to 1868. His nephew, the sixth Marquess, succeeded to the Earldom of Clanricarde (1800 creation) in 1916 on the death of his cousin Hubert George de Burgh-Canning, 2nd Marquess of Clanricarde. As of 2014, the titles are held by his great-nephew, the twelfth Marquess, who succeeded his first cousin in 2014. He is a property consultant living in the central highlands of regional Victoria, Australia.

The family seat was Westport House, near Westport, County Mayo in Ireland. After the death of the 11th Marquess, it passed to his five daughters, in accordance with a private legislation passed by the Irish Senate in 1993. Westport House was sold by Lord Sligo's daughters in October 2017, breaking the formal link between Westport House and the family which had been ongoing for 380 years. The house was sold to the Hughes family, a local family of entrepreneurs with Portwest clothing manufacturing operations and a hotel in Westport.

Barons Mount Eagle (1760), Viscounts Westport (1768), Earls of Altamont (1771)
John Browne, 1st Earl of Altamont (c. 1709-1776)
Peter Browne, 2nd Earl of Altamont (c. 1731-1780)
John Denis Browne, 3rd Earl of Altamont (1756–1809) (created Marquess of Sligo In 1800)

Marquesses of Sligo (1800), Barons Monteagle (1806), Earls of Clanricarde (1916)
John Denis Browne, 1st Marquess of Sligo (1756–1809)
Howe Peter Browne, 2nd Marquess of Sligo (1788–1845)
George John Browne, 3rd Marquess of Sligo (1820–1896)
John Thomas Browne, 4th Marquess of Sligo  (1824–1903)
Henry Ulick Browne, 5th Marquess of Sligo (1831–1913)
George Ulick Browne, 6th Marquess of Sligo (1856–1935)
Ulick de Burgh Browne, 7th Marquess of Sligo (1898–1941)
Arthur Howe Browne, 8th Marquess of Sligo (1867–1951)
Terence Morris Browne, 9th Marquess of Sligo (1873–1952)
Denis Edward Browne, 10th Marquess of Sligo (1908–1991)
Jeremy Ulick Browne, 11th Marquess of Sligo (1939–2014)
Sebastian Ulick Browne, 12th Marquess of Sligo (b. 1964)

Present peer
Sebastian Ulick Browne, 12th Marquess of Sligo (born 27 May 1964) is the son of Lord Ulick Browne and his wife Fiona Glenn and a first cousin of the 11th Marquess. He was educated at Rugby School.

On 13 July 2014, Browne succeeded as Marquess of Sligo (I., 1800), Earl of Clanricarde (I., 1800), Earl of Altamont (I., 1771), Viscount Westport, of Westport (I., 1768), Baron Monteagle of Westport (I., 1760), and Baron Monteagle of Westport (U.K., 1806).

He did not inherit Westport House and the Altamont estate in Ireland, as his predecessor the 11th Marquess had successfully pursued an act of parliament of Seanad Éireann which enabled him to break the family trust and leave the estate to his five daughters. They sold the property in 2017.

In 1984, Browne married firstly Christina Maria Suaznabar, daughter of Luis Suaznabar; they were divorced in 1992, after having two children:
Lady Camilla Browne (born 1986)
Christopher Ulick Browne, Earl of Altamont (born 1988), heir apparent

On 22 January 2016, at Wollongong, New South Wales, he married secondly Claire Suzanne van Middelkoop.

Line of succession

 Peter Browne, 2nd Earl of Altamont (c. 1731–1780)
 John Browne, 1st Marquess of Sligo (1756–1809)
 Howe Browne, 2nd Marquess of Sligo (1788–1845)
 Henry Browne, 5th Marquess of Sligo (1831–1913)
Lord Alfred Eden Browne (1878–1918)
Lord Ulick Browne (1915–1979)
 Sebastian Browne, 12th Marquess of Sligo (b. 1964)
(1). Christopher Ulick Browne, Earl of Altamont (b. 1988)
Lord Richard Howe Brown (1834–1912)
Percy Howe Browne (1868–1940)
Anthony Howe Browne (1905–1940)
(2). Patrick Ulick Anthony Howe Browne (b. 1935)
(3). Patrick Alexander Howe Browne (b. 1965)
(4). Anthony Howe Browne (b. 1967)
(5). son - Browne
(6). Michael John le Roy Browne (b. 1936)
(7).   Richard Howe Browne (b. 1962)
(8).  Jeremy Ulick Browne (b. 1963)

References

External links
 Westport House website

Marquessates in the Peerage of Ireland
County Sligo
1800 establishments in Ireland
Marquess
Noble titles created in 1800